Streptomyces shaanxiensis is a blue pigmented bacterium species from the genus of Streptomyces which has been isolated from a sewage irrigation area in the Shaanxii province in China.

See also 
 List of Streptomyces species

References

Further reading

External links
Type strain of Streptomyces shaanxiensis at BacDive -  the Bacterial Diversity Metadatabase	

shaanxiensis
Bacteria described in 2012